Mônica Hickmann Alves (born 21 April 1987), commonly known as Mônica, is a Brazilian professional footballer who plays as a defender for Spanish Liga F club Madrid CFF and the Brazil national team. She participated in the 2015 and 2019 FIFA Women's World Cups and the 2016 Rio Olympics.

Club career
Between 2007 and 2012, Mônica played club football in Austria for SV Neulengbach, the dominant team in the ÖFB-Frauenliga. Upon returning to Brazil, she had a short spell with Botucatu Futebol Clube, then joined Ferroviária ahead of the 2013 season.

She then joined the new expansion side, the Orlando Pride of the National Women's Soccer League for the 2016 season, complemented by loan spells with Adelaide United and Atlético Madrid in the 2016 and 2017 offseasons respectively. On February 18, 2019, after three seasons with Orlando she announced she was leaving the club.

In April 2019, Mônica signed for reigning Campeonato Brasileiro de Futebol Feminino champions Corinthians.

In August 2019, Mônica signed for Spanish Primera División club Madrid CFF.

International career
At the 2006 FIFA U-20 Women's World Championship, Mônica was part of the Brazilian team which finished third. She made her senior Brazil women's national football team debut on 11 June 2014, a 0–0 friendly draw with France staged in Guyana. She scored her first national team goal in Brazil's 7–1 win over Ecuador at the 2015 Pan American Games. A controversial own goal by Mônica against Australia at the 2019 FIFA Women's World Cup saw Brazil lose its first group stage match in 24 years.

International goals
Scores and results list Brazil's goal tally first.

References

External links
 
 

1987 births
Living people
Footballers from Porto Alegre
Brazilian women's footballers
Brazil women's international footballers
Brazilian expatriate sportspeople in Spain
Expatriate women's footballers in Spain
2015 FIFA Women's World Cup players
Footballers at the 2016 Summer Olympics
Women's association football defenders
Brazilian expatriate women's footballers
Brazilian expatriate sportspeople in Austria
Expatriate women's footballers in Austria
SV Neulengbach (women) players
Associação Ferroviária de Esportes (women) players
Footballers at the 2015 Pan American Games
Orlando Pride players
Adelaide United FC (A-League Women) players
National Women's Soccer League players
A-League Women players
Expatriate women's soccer players in the United States
Brazilian expatriate sportspeople in the United States
Olympic footballers of Brazil
Brazilian expatriate sportspeople in Australia
Expatriate women's soccer players in Australia
Botucatu Futebol Clube players
Sport Club Corinthians Paulista (women) players
2019 FIFA Women's World Cup players
Primera División (women) players
Madrid CFF players
Pan American Games medalists in football
Pan American Games gold medalists for Brazil
ÖFB-Frauenliga players
Medalists at the 2015 Pan American Games
Sport Club Internacional (women) players